The 1997 Memphis Tigers football team represented the University of Memphis in the 1997 NCAA Division I-A football season. Memphis competed as a member of Conference USA.  The team was led by head coach Rip Scherer.  The Tigers played their home games at the Liberty Bowl Memorial Stadium.

Schedule

References

Memphis
Memphis Tigers football seasons
Memphis Tigers football